Whittlesey is a census-designated place in the town of Chelsea, Taylor County, Wisconsin, United States. Its population was 105 as of the 2010 census.

References

Census-designated places in Taylor County, Wisconsin
Census-designated places in Wisconsin